A lead-in is a short phrase, usually five words or less, that starts off a photo caption in a newspaper, high school yearbook, magazine or other publication.

Lead-ins (a.k.a. "kickers") are used to catch the reader's attention and "lead in" to the main caption. These phrases widely range from common phrases to song lyrics, and are written appropriate to the subject matter of the photograph. This is separate to lead in which makes reference to getting new business into a sales team, typically.

Examples of lead-ins include the following:
(On a picture of a farmer putting down pinestraw) Piling it on...
(On a picture of a guidance counselor taking attendance folders) Makin' the rounds...

See also
24-hour news cycle
Breaking news
Broadcast Journalism
CNN effect
Electronic journalism
Electronic news-gathering (ENGLISH)
Journalism
Journalist
Local news
Media event
News broadcasting
News presenter
News program
Reporter
Sports commentator
Television news
Television program

Television terminology